Azov was a  cargo ship that was built in 1944 by Deutsche Werft, Hamburg, Germany as Deike Rickmers for Rickmers Line. In 1945, she was seized by the Allies and passed to the Ministry of War Transport (MoWT), renamed Empire Concord. In 1946, she was passed to the Soviet Union and renamed Azov. She served until 1973 when she was scrapped.

Description
The ship was built in 1944 by Deutsche Werft, Hamburg.

She had a GRT of 1,953 and a NRT of 935.

The ship was propelled by a four-cylinder compound steam engine, which had two cylinders of 16 inches (42 cm) diameter and two cylinders of 35 inches (90 cm) diameter by 35 inches (90 cm) stroke. The engine was built by Waggon und Maschinenbau, Görlitz.

History
Deike Rickmers was built for Rickmers Line, Hamburg. In May 1945, Deike Rickmers was seized by the Allies at Kiel. She was passed to the MoWT and renamed Empire Concord. She was placed under the management of the Dillwyn Steamship Co Ltd. Her port of registry was changed to London. The Code Letters GFQB and United Kingdom Official Number 180720 were allocated.

Soviet Union period
In 1946, Empire Conclyde was transferred to the Soviet Union, and was renamed Azov. Following the end of the Chinese Civil War in 1950, she was the first foreign ship to sail up the Pearl River to Canton.

In 1958, during the repair at city Dalnyi (CPP) was reconstructed for liquid fuel use and became a cargo-passenger ship as per project "Dalsudoremstroy".

The ship received IMO number 5032254. Azov served until 1973, when she was scrapped at Kure, Japan.

Photos
  Steamer Азов.

References

1944 ships
Ships built in Hamburg
Steamships of Germany
Merchant ships of Germany
World War II merchant ships of Germany
Ministry of War Transport ships
Empire ships
Steamships of the United Kingdom
Merchant ships of the United Kingdom
Steamships of the Soviet Union
Merchant ships of the Soviet Union
Soviet Union–United Kingdom relations
Germany–Soviet Union relations